"You Feel Good All Over" is a song written by Sonny Throckmorton, and recorded by American country music artist T. G. Sheppard.  It was released in April 1979 as the first single from the album 3/4 Lonely.  The song reached #4 on the Billboard Hot Country Singles & Tracks chart.

Charts

Weekly charts

Year-end charts

References

1979 singles
T. G. Sheppard songs
Songs written by Sonny Throckmorton
Song recordings produced by Buddy Killen
Warner Records singles
Curb Records singles
1979 songs